Alpena County is a county in the U.S. state of Michigan. As of the 2020 Census, the population was 28,907.  The county seat is Alpena. It is considered to be part of Northern Michigan.

Alpena County comprises the Alpena, MI Micropolitan Statistical Area.

History

The county was created by the Michigan Legislature in 1840 as Anamickee County, then renamed in 1843 to Alpena County, a pseudo-Native American word — a neologism coined by Henry Schoolcraft, meaning "a good partridge country."  This was part of a much larger effort to rename a great many of the Michigan counties at the time. It was officially organized in 1857.

Geography

Alpena County is in the northeast of the mitten-shaped Lower Peninsula of Michigan. Lake Huron and Thunder Bay are to the east, Alcona County to the south, Oscoda County to the southwest, Montmorency County to the west, and Presque Isle County to the north. Most of the county is drained by the Thunder Bay River and its tributaries. The Mackinaw State Forest occupies large tracts of land in the county. The Thunder Bay National Marine Sanctuary is offshore adjacent to the county.

The 45th parallel bisects the county, meaning it is halfway between the North Pole and the equator.

Several islands in Thunder Bay are part of the Michigan Islands National Wildlife Refuge. There are automated lighthouses on Middle Island and Thunder Bay Island.

Geographic features
 Thunder Bay River
 Long Lake
 Grand Lake
Glaciers shaped the area, creating a unique regional ecosystem. A large portion of the area is so-called Grayling outwash plain, consisting of broad outwash plain including sandy ice-disintegration ridges; jack pine barrens, some white pine-red pine forest, and northern hardwood forests. Large lakes were created by glacial action. Some of the inland lakes are truly massive.

Adjacent counties
 Alcona County - south
 Oscoda County - southwest
 Montmorency County - west
 Presque Isle County - north

Major highways
  serves Alpena on its way along the Lake Huron shoreline. To the north, it passes past Long Lake and Grand Lake, thence to Rogers City, Michigan, through Cheboygan, Michigan, and on to Mackinaw City, Michigan, where it ends and connects to I-75 and the Mackinac Bridge.
  ends its  easterly cross-peninsular route from Lake Michigan to Lake Huron within downtown Alpena at an intersection with US 23.
  is a more direct route to the south than US 23, which meanders along the lake shore through many villages and towns. M-65 goes north to Rogers City.

National protected area
 Michigan Islands National Wildlife Refuge (part)

Demographics

The 2010 United States Census indicates Alpena County had a 2010 population of 29,598. This is a decrease of -1,716 people from the 2000 United States Census. Overall, the county had a -5.5% growth rate during this ten-year period. In 2010 there were 12,791 households and 8,164 families in the county. The population density was 51.8 per square mile (20.0 square kilometers). There were 16,053 housing units at an average density of 28.1 per square mile (10.8 square kilometers). 97.5% of the population were White, 0.5% Native American, 0.5% Asian, 0.3% Black or African American, 0.1% of some other race and 1.1% of two or more races. 1.0% were Hispanic or Latino (of any race). 26.8% were of German, 19.5% Polish, 12.9% French, French Canadian or Cajun, 8.1% English, 6.4% Irish and 5.7% American ancestry.

There were 12,791 households, out of which 25.3% had children under the age of 18 living with them, 50.0% were husband and wife families, 9.8% had a female householder with no husband present, 36.2% were non-families, and 30.8% were made up of individuals. The average household size was 2.27 and the average family size was 2.81.

In the county, the population was spread out, with 20.9% under age of 18, 7.4% from 18 to 24, 20.8% from 25 to 44, 31.5% from 45 to 64, and 19.5% who were 65 years of age or older. The median age was 46 years. For every 100 females there were 96.4 males. For every 100 females age 18 and over, there were 94.1 males.

The 2010 American Community Survey 3-year estimate indicates the median income for a household in the county was $36,242 and the median income for a family was $46,718. Males had a median income of $27,002 versus $15,670 for females. The per capita income for the county was $21,713. About 2.5% of families and 16.9% of the population were below the poverty line, including 27.2% of those under the age 18 and 10.0% of those age 65 or over.

Religion
Alpena County is part of the Roman Catholic Diocese of Gaylord.

Government

The county government operates the jail, maintains rural roads, operates the major local courts, keeps files of deeds and mortgages, maintains vital records, administers public health regulations, and participates with the state in the provision of welfare and other social services. The county board of commissioners controls the budget but has only limited authority to make laws or ordinances. In Michigan, most local government functions — police and fire, building and zoning, tax assessment, street maintenance, etc. — are the responsibility of individual cities and townships.

The County operates three parks (and camp grounds) with beaches on local lakes, namely Beaver Lake Park in Lachine; Long Lake Park in Alpena; and Sunken Lake Park in Posen

Events
There are many recurring local activities.
 Alpena Blues Festival, late June at The Alpena Fair Grounds and Merchant Building.
 Alpena County Fair, Alpena County Fairgrounds.
 Alpena Earth Day Celebration, April 22. Location in Alpena varies. Food, games.
 Besser Museum Log Cabin Day, last Sunday in June. Approved by the Michigan legislature passed a bill to make Log Cabin Day an annual event to be held on the last Sunday in June. The Besser Museum for Northeast Michigan spotlights their own two log cabins on this day and celebrates by offering old fashioned, family activities.
 Great Lakes Lighthouse Festival, second weekend in October.
 Habitat for Humanity-Alpena Area "Drive to Build" Charity Golf Outing
 Lafarge Downtown Alpena Riverfest, in mid-June. Family event centered on the Thunder Bay River, celebrating Alpena's lumbering history. Professional lumberjack shows, entertainment, music, storytelling, chainsaw carving, food, and games.
 Michigan Brown Trout Festival, a week in mid-July.
 Ramblin' Rods Car Show, second weekend in August at Mich-E-Kewis Park, Alpena.
 Shelter, Inc. "Garden Walk", nine Gardens, all in Alpena, MI. 49707
 Sunrise Side Heritage Bike Ride, Second weekend in September. Ride Along Lake Huron Shoreline (US - 23) to Mackinac Bridge then South to West Branch (M-33).
 Thunder Bay Arts Council's "Art on the Bay" at beautiful Bay View Park in Alpena. A Juried Fine Arts and Fine Crafts Fair which coincides with The Michigan Brown Trout Festival. There are over one Hundred and Fifty Artist will fill more than 180 booths with their original artwork.
 Thunder Bay Maritime Festival takes place at 500 W. Fletcher Street, Alpena, MI. 49707. It is presented by the Thunder Bay National Marine Sanctuary and Underwater Preserve.
 Youth Sailing Instruction and Training is offered by the Alpena Yacht Club.

Media
The Alpena News is the daily newspaper of record for much of Northeast lower peninsula of Michigan. For a complete list of other media, see Alpena, Michigan.

Arts and culture

Museums
 Besser Museum for Northeast Michigan
 Thunder Bay National Marine Sanctuary.

Historical markers
There are seven recognized historical markers in the county:
 Alpena County Courthouse
 Alpena City Hall
 The Daniel Carter Family
 First Congregational Church [Alpena]
 Monarch Mill
 St. Bernard Catholic Church
 World's Largest Cement Plant

Communities

City
 Alpena (county seat)

Village
 Hillman (partially)

Charter township
 Alpena Charter Township

Civil townships

 Green Township
 Long Rapids Township
 Maple Ridge Township
 Ossineke Township
 Sanborn Township
 Wellington Township
 Wilson Township

Census-designated place
 Ossineke

Other unincorporated communities

 Bolton
 Cathro
 Herron
 Hubbard Lake
 Lachine
 Leer
 Spratt

See also
 Alpena Community College
 List of Michigan State Historic Sites in Alpena County, Michigan
 National Register of Historic Places listings in Alpena County, Michigan

References

External links

 Alpena County Government
 Alpena County parks
 
 Alpena County Soil Survey, U.S. Dept. of Agriculture, Michigan State University Extension Service (soil, history, good general information)
 Besser Museum home page
 Clarke Historical Library, Central Michigan University, Bibliography on Alpena County
 Enchanted forest, Northern Michigan source for information, calendars, etc.
 Thunder Bay Marine Sanctuary, Underwater Preserve and Museum

 
1857 establishments in Michigan
Michigan counties
Populated places established in 1857